The Roman Catholic Diocese of Wukari is a diocese of the Roman Catholic Church in Nigeria.

History
 14 December 2022: the diocese was established from the Diocese of Jalingo.

See also
Roman Catholicism in Nigeria

References

Roman Catholic dioceses in Nigeria
Christian organizations established in 2022
Roman Catholic dioceses and prelatures established in the 21st century
Roman Catholic Ecclesiastical Province of Jos